The battle of Hlukhiv was a series of clashes that began on February 24, 2022, in the town of Hlukhiv, Hlukhiv Raion, Sumy Oblast, as part of the Russian invasion of Ukraine in 2022.

Timeline

February 24, 2022 
Early in the morning of February 24, 2022 at 5:23 a.m., Russian troops crossed the state border of Ukraine, passing through the Bashivsk checkpoint. According to Sumy Oblast officials, up to 90 people, including 18 border guards, were taken prisoner at the border checkpoint in Bashivsk.  The prisoners were taken to the Russian village of Kokino in Bryansk oblast.

The battle at Hlukhiv began when the Russian soldiers who captured the border checkpoint at Bachivsk attempted to advance towards the town of Shostka. On the highway north of the town between Hlukhiv and Bashivsk, a gas station exploded during a battle, killing 1 Ukrainian soldier and wounding 3 more. 11 more Ukrainian soldiers were wounded during the first hour of fighting outside of Hlukhiv.

Russian troops passed through Hlukhiv at noon on February 24, with Sumy Oblast governor Dmytro Zhyvytskyi stating that Russian troops controlled the highway between Hlukhiv and the Russian border, along with the town of Baturyn. Later that day at 4:24pm, Ukrainian forces claimed the destruction of a column of Russian vehicles, allegedly including 15 T-72 tanks and 14 armored vehicles. Between 4pm and 11:30pm on February 24 in Hlukhiv, there was no fighting or shelling.

Fighting restarted around 11:30 in the village of Peremoha, south of Hlukhiv, and central Hlukhiv, with Ukrainian forces destroying a convoy from the 58th Combined Arms Army.

February 25 
The following day, a convoy of 17 Russian vehicles passed through Hlukhiv on the way to Dubovichi, and there was one civilian casualty after Russian troops shot at him. On the evening of February 25, Russian troops secured control of the Kipti-Bachivsk highway, and set up roadblocks so civilians could not use the road. The convoy stalled on the road for the rest of the day.

February 26–27 
On February 26, 52 of the previously kidnapped border guards taken at the Bachivsk checkpoint were given back to Ukraine, although 26 border guards still remained in Russian custody The next day, three BTGs were stopped near Hlukhiv.

March—April 
On the evening of March 1, Ukrainian troops partially freed the Kipti-Bachivsk highway, which had been controlled by Russian forces since the early days of the invasion. However, it is unknown whether Sumy Oblast officials were able to gain access into Hlukhiv. On March 2, border guards of the 5th border detachment in an advanced group, together with units of the Armed Forces of Ukraine, pushed out the occupiers and reached the state border line in Sumy Oblast. On the afternoon of March 17, Russian forces in Hlukhiv cut off Internet access and electricity with the rest of Ukraine.

Russian forces pulled out of Hlukhiv in early April after the failure of the Northeastern Ukraine offensive. Ukrainian forces regained control of Hlukhiv on April 11, along with the rest of Sumy, Chernihiv, and Kyiv oblasts. Due to close proximity with the Russian border however, Hlukhiv has been subject to Russian airstrikes and skirmishes ever since its recapture by Ukrainian forces.

Aftermath 

 
After Ukrainian forces regained control of Hlukhiv, pyrotechnicians discovered 1,145 explosive devices in the village of Oblozhky, near Hlukhiv. Russian forces also began shelling border communities in Sumy and Chernihiv oblasts, including Hlukhiv. The first incident in Hlukhiv was on May 9, during Victory Day, when Russian forces bombed a Jewish cemetery. On May 18, 10 explosions were heard in Hlukhiv. The next incident of shelling in Hlukhiv was on July 1, after Russian forces shelled numerous border towns including Hlukhiv. On July 18, Russian forces shelled Hlukhiv again, with no casualties.

References 

Hlukhiv
History of Sumy Oblast
Northeastern Ukraine campaign
February 2022 events in Ukraine
March 2022 events in Ukraine
April 2022 events in Ukraine